The statistical offices of the German states (German: Statistische Landesämter) carry out the task of collecting official statistics in Germany together and in cooperation with the Federal Statistical Office.

The implementation of statistics according to Article 83 of the constitution is executed at state level. The federal government has, under Article 73 (1) 11. of the constitution, the exclusive legislation for the "statistics for federal purposes."

There are 14 statistical offices for the 16 states:

See also 
 Federal Statistical Office of Germany

References 

Germany
Statistical offices
Germany